The Tamblot uprising of 1621, also known as the Tamblot revolution or Tamblot revolt, was led by Tamblot, a babaylan or native priest from the island of Bohol in the Philippines.

References

External links
 Chris Antonette P. Pugay The Revolts before the Revolution www.nhi.gov.ph

Conflicts in 1621
17th-century rebellions
Tamblot Uprising
Visayan history
Tamblot Uprising
Philippine revolts against Spain
1621 in the Philippines